The Jirau Dam is a rock-fill dam with an asphalt-concrete core, currently under construction on the Madeira River in the state of Rondônia, Brazil. The dam's hydroelectric power stations will have 50 turbines each 75 MW resulting total installed capacity of 3,750 MW. The power plant's first unit was commissioned in September 2013, the 16th in November 2014, 24th in February 2015, the 41st in December 2015, and the last in December 2016. Most of the power is designed to be exported to south-eastern Brazil via the Rio Madeira HVDC system.

The dam is part of a planned four power plant Madeira river hydroelectric complex, which will consist of two dams in Brazil (3,580 MW Santo Antônio Dam at the city of Porto Velho and Jirau), a third on the border of Brazil and Bolivia, and a fourth station inside Bolivia. Two of these, Santo Antonio and Jirau, are currently under construction, while the smaller upstream dams are still in the planning stages. In part due to the 2001–2002 power shortage in Brazil, construction of both dams was accelerated in 2009. The total estimated cost of the two facilities currently under construction is $15.6 billion ($8 billion for Jirau), including about $10 billion for the civil engineering and power plants, and $5 billion for ship locks, transmission lines, and environmental re-mediation. The Madeira river hydroelectric complex is part of the Initiative for the Integration of the Regional Infrastructure of South America, an effort by South American governments to integrate the continent's infrastructure with new investments in transportation, energy, and communication. Construction on the project was temporary halted in March 2011, February 2012 and April 2013 due to worker riots or strikes.

The Brazilian Development Bank approved an additional US$1.6 billion for the project in September 2012. The extra funding will add six more 75 MW bulb turbine-generators to the power station (a total of 50) and pay for transmission lines.

Design
The Jirau Dam is a combination embankment dam with concrete sections for the power stations and spillway. The run-of-the-river dam's power station contain 50 x 75 MW bulb turbines for a total installed capacity of 3,750 MW. Bulb turbines are a variation of the Kaplan turbine, with the main differences being that bulb turbines are installed horizontally and are generally considered to be slightly more efficient. The power plant is constructed by the French utility GDF Suez SA and Brazilian company Camargo Correa SA.

Impacts
Brazilian law requires water impoundments to undergo a very thorough approval process to ensure that each project meets environmental, social, political, and safety criteria.  However, critics of the Jirau and Santo Antonio dam claim that many legal criteria were rubber-stamped before all questions from impacted groups had been addressed. The dam's social impacts received the majority of substantive criticism (see below).  However, environmental groups noted that the fast track approval for the Madeira dams sets a dangerous precedent.  Brazilian law allows for expedited licensing for eco-friendly projects described by the Worldwatch institute as "kindler, gentler dams with smaller reservoirs, designed to lessen social and environmental impacts."  The Worldwatch Institute insists that no project should "fast-track the licensing of new dams in Amazonia and allow projects to circumvent Brazil's tough environmental laws".

Social
The most frequent objection is that the dam builders failed to adequately consult with indigenous peoples, as required by law. The Brazilian government indigenous protection foundation FUNAI predicts that there may be un-contacted indigenous populations in the region that will be affected by the Madeira complex.  Most of the affected populations are nearest to the Jirau dam. The threat to uncontacted Indians has motivated both internal and external criticism of GDF Suez, the contractor responsible for building the Jirau dam.  A coalition of non-governmental organizations called for dam construction to be halted, and questions were raised during annual meeting of GDF Suez.

Moreover, federal prosecutors are suing ESBR (Energia Sustentável do Brasil), the company responsible for the dam, the Brazilian Institute of Environment (IBAMA) and the Brazilian Development Bank (BNDES) for the non-accomplishment of some of the conditions previewed by the environmental license and for the indemnification for losses on the traditional fishers' revenues.

Environmental
Because both the Jirau and Santo Antonio dams are run-of-the-river projects, neither dam impounds a large reservoir.  Both dams also feature significant environmental re-mediation efforts.  As a consequence, there has not been strong environmental opposition to the implementation of the Madeira river complex. However, critics point out that if the fish ladders fail, "several valuable migratory fish species could suffer near-extinction as a result of the Madeira dams."
 Jirau's environmentally friendly design earned the plant registration under the "Clean Development Mechanism" (CDM) program of the United Nations.  Jirau is the largest renewable energy plant to earn the CDM, which is awarded to innovative projects that help to solve environmental problems such as climate change.

Labor
Construction on the dam was halted on 18 March 2011 as workers rioted; setting fire to buses and destroying part of the worker housing. Wages and the treatment by security officials was attributed to the rioting. Additional security personal had to be sent to the site and construction was halted. Workers went on strike at Jirau and Santo Antonio in April 2013 after a salary increase proposal was rejected.

Opportunities for Bolivia
Bolivia has been a landlocked country since it lost its coastline to Chile in the war of the pacific in 1884.  Many Bolivians feel a deep and lasting bitterness due to this loss, and the Bolivian military continues to build and maintain an open ocean navy in Lake Titicaca, awaiting an eventual recovery of access to the sea.  The Madeira river complex presents an opportunity for Bolivia because all of the hydroelectric dams would feature ship locks capable of raising and lowering oceangoing vessels.  If the project is completed, "more than 4,000 km of waterways upstream from the dams in Brazil, Bolivia, and Peru would become navigable."
Hence, if the project is completed, both Bolivian commercial vessels and the Bolivian navy would have access to the open ocean, and lucrative sea lanes, for the first time in 120 years.

Killing of an environmental activist 
The body of the Brazilian environmental activist Nilce de Souza Magalhães, also known as Nicinha, was found on 21 June 2016 in the hydro-power dam's lake of Jirau. Nicinha, leadership of MAB in Rondônia was missing since 7 January 2016. Her body was found only 400 meters away from where she used to live. Her body was found by the workers of the dam, her hands and feet were tied by a rope and tied to a rock.

She was known in the region for the struggle in defense of the affected populations, denouncing human rights violations committed by the consortium responsible for the Jirau power plant, called Energia Sustentável do Brasil (ESBR). Nicinha was daughter of rubber extractors who came from the Brazilian state of Acre to the city of Abuna (near Porto Velho) in Rondonia, where she lived almost fifty years and was evicted along with other fishers due to the construction of the dam. The encampment where they had lived had no access to clean water or electricity.

Nicinha made several complaints over the years, attending public hearings and events, including, pointed out the serious impacts of predatory fishing activity on the Madeira River. The complaints generated two civil investigations being conducted by the Federal Prosecutor's Office and the State Prosecutor's Office on the non-implementation of the Program of Support to Fishing Activity and another of criminal character, because of data manipulation in monitoring reports.

His killer, Edione Pessoa da Silva, who was is prison after confessing to murder Nicinha, escaped from the State Penitentiary "Edvan Mariano Rosendo", located in Porto Velho (RO) in April 2016.

See also

List of power stations in Brazil
Jirau and Santo Antônio: tales of an Amazonian war (video documentary)

References

Dams in Rondônia